Women & Waves is the 2000 album by Jimmy Ibbotson. Ibbotson is a former member of the Nitty Gritty Dirt Band.

Track listing
"Casa Zopilote" (J. Ibbotson)
"Women and Waves" (J. Ibbotson)
"I Was A Fool" (J. Ibbotson)
"No Big T'ing" (J. Ibbotson)
"Peppy and Libby" (J. Ibbotson)
"Los Perdidos" (Leonard Martinez)
"Pre-Pizarro" (J. Ibbotson / B. Carpenter)
"Arthur and Ellen" (J. Ibbotson / B. Carpenter)
"Drunk After Dinner" (J. Ibbotson)
"Cortez Sea" (J. Ibbotson / R. Johnson)
"Let IT Go" (J. Ibbotson)

Personnel
Jimmie Ibbotson - vocals, silver flute, mandolin, bass, guitar, flat iron mandola, synthesizer, Navaho duck flute, bass drum and box, Napaleeze reed flute, tom-toms
Background vocals on No Big T'ing - Frank Johnson, John Carson, Steve and Zel'elle, Kallie ALbert, Eddy, Jose and Noe, Jim and Sarah, and Hoss, JOe Shepard.
Bob Carpenter - on Pre-Pizarro he recorded the basic track.

Production
Producer - not credited on CD

References
All information from the album liner notes, unless otherwise noted.

2000 albums
Jimmy Ibbotson albums